Martin van Bruinessen is a Dutch anthropologist and author, who has published a number of publications on the Kurdish, Indonesian, Turkish, Persian cultures, and also on aspects of Islam as a whole.

He taught the sociology of religion at the State Institute of Islamic Studies of Yogyakarta, Indonesia
and has been teaching Kurdish and Turkish studies at Utrecht University, the Netherlands since 1994 as associate professor.
He shifted his emphasis in 1998 to a broader scope, Islamic Studies, after becoming Professor of the Comparative Study of Contemporary Muslim Societies at Utrecht University.

He also wrote and researched some issues of the early stages of Islam in Java.

References 
 Personal Profile, Utrecht University

External links
 Academic page

Living people
Dutch anthropologists
People from Schoonhoven
Utrecht University alumni
Academic staff of Utrecht University
Dutch Islamic studies scholars